Elections to Cookstown District Council were held on 5 May 2005 on the same day as the other Northern Irish local government elections. The election used three district electoral areas to elect a total of 16 councillors.

Election results

Note: "Votes" are the first preference votes.

Districts summary

|- class="unsortable" align="centre"
!rowspan=2 align="left"|Ward
! % 
!Cllrs
! % 
!Cllrs
! %
!Cllrs
! %
!Cllrs
! % 
!Cllrs
!rowspan=2|TotalCllrs
|- class="unsortable" align="center"
!colspan=2 bgcolor="" | Sinn Féin
!colspan=2 bgcolor="" | SDLP
!colspan=2 bgcolor="" | DUP
!colspan=2 bgcolor="" | UUP
!colspan=2 bgcolor="white"| Others
|-
|align="left"|Ballinderry
|N/A
|2
|N/A
|2
|N/A
|1
|N/A
|1
|N/A
|0
|6
|-
|align="left"|Cookstown Central
|bgcolor="#008800"|27.9
|bgcolor="#008800"|1
|21.1
|2
|26.1
|1
|23.2
|1
|1.7
|0
|5
|-
|align="left"|Drum Manor
|bgcolor="#008800"|38.5
|bgcolor="#008800"|2
|13.9
|1
|19.1
|1
|16.1
|1
|12.4
|0
|5
|- class="unsortable" class="sortbottom" style="background:#C9C9C9"
|align="left"| Total
|33.5
|5
|17.3
|5
|22.5
|3
|19.5
|3
|7.2
|0
|16
|-
|}

District results

Ballinderry

2001: 2 x Sinn Féin, 2 x SDLP, 1 x DUP, 1 x UUP
2005: 2 x Sinn Féin, 2 x SDLP, 1 x DUP, 1 x UUP
2001-2005 Change: No change

As only six candidates had been nominated for six seats, there was no vote in Ballinderry and all six candidates were deemed elected.

Cookstown Central

2001: 2 x Sinn Féin, 1 x SDLP, 1 x DUP, 1 x UUP
2005: 2 x SDLP, 1 x Sinn Féin, 1 x DUP, 1 x UUP
2001-2005 Change: SDLP gain from Sinn Féin

Drum Manor

2001: 2 x Sinn Féin, 1 x UUP, 1 x SDLP, 1 x Independent
2005: 2 x Sinn Féin, 1 x UUP, 1 x SDLP, 1 x DUP
2001-2005 Change: DUP gain from Independent

References

Cookstown District Council elections
Cookstown